Volodymyr Mazorchuk (born 1972) is a Ukrainian-Swedish mathematician at Uppsala University and was awarded the Göran Gustafsson Prize in 2016.

He received his PhD in mathematics from Taras Shevchenko National University of Kyiv in 1996 with advisor Yuriy Drozd.

Selected publications

Articles

Books

References

Taras Shevchenko National University of Kyiv alumni
Academic staff of Uppsala University
20th-century Swedish mathematicians
1972 births
Living people
21st-century Swedish mathematicians